Xylota ouelleti is a species of hoverfly in the family Syrphidae.

Distribution
Canada: New Brunswick, Nova Scotia, Manitoba.
United States: Washington, Michigan,  Georgia, Alabama, New York, Pennsylvania, New Jersey, Maryland, Missouri. 
GBIF species page

References

Eristalinae
Insects described in 1941
Diptera of North America
Hoverflies of North America
Taxa named by Charles Howard Curran